The 1971 war may refer to:

 Bangladesh liberation war
 Indo-Pakistani War of 1971